Troy McIntosh (born March 29, 1973) is a male sprinter from The Bahamas. He represented his nation at the Summer Olympics in 1996 and 2000. He had his greatest achievements with the Bahamian 4×400 metres relay team. He won the bronze medal in that event at the 2000 Summer Olympics after the United States team were retrospectively disqualified due to doping. This same disqualification, of Antonio Pettigrew, also resulted in Bahamas taking the gold medal at the 2001 World Championships in Athletics, where McIntosh was initially a silver medallist.

Individually he was the bronze medallist in the 400 metres at the 1998 IAAF World Cup and the champion at the 1998 Central American and Caribbean Games. He ran an indoor Bahamian record of 46.05 seconds at the 1999 IAAF World Indoor Championships, where he finished fourth.

Achievements

References

External links
 
 Picture of Troy McIntosh

1973 births
Living people
Bahamian male sprinters
Olympic athletes of the Bahamas
Athletes (track and field) at the 1996 Summer Olympics
Athletes (track and field) at the 2000 Summer Olympics
Medalists at the 2000 Summer Olympics
Commonwealth Games medallists in athletics
Athletes (track and field) at the 1999 Pan American Games
Athletes (track and field) at the 2003 Pan American Games
Athletes (track and field) at the 2007 Pan American Games
Pan American Games competitors for the Bahamas
Athletes (track and field) at the 1998 Commonwealth Games
Athletes (track and field) at the 2002 Commonwealth Games
Athletes (track and field) at the 2006 Commonwealth Games
World Athletics Championships medalists
Olympic bronze medalists for the Bahamas
Olympic bronze medalists in athletics (track and field)
Commonwealth Games bronze medallists for the Bahamas
Goodwill Games medalists in athletics
Central American and Caribbean Games gold medalists for the Bahamas
Competitors at the 1998 Central American and Caribbean Games
World Athletics Championships winners
Central American and Caribbean Games medalists in athletics
Competitors at the 2001 Goodwill Games
Medallists at the 2002 Commonwealth Games